JoeBen Bevirt is an American serial entrepreneur and the founder and CEO of Joby Aviation, a California-based aerospace company. He is the recipient of the 2018 Haueter Award and holds more than 160 U.S. patents in aerodynamics, aircraft design, electric and hydrogen propulsion.

Early life and education 
Bevirt was born to Paula Fry and Ron Bevirt. He was raised in Last Chance, California. His name was inspired by a character JoeBen in his family friend Ken Kesey’s novel.

Bevirt graduated from Santa Cruz High School in 1991. He holds a Bachelor of Science in Mechanical Engineering from University of California, Davis and a Master of Science in Mechanical Engineering from Stanford University.

Career 
Bevirt had been interested in engineering since his childhood and built one of the world’s first full-suspension mountain bikes while at high school. He co-founded Velocity11 in 1999 to develop robotic laboratory systems for life sciences discovery. The company was later acquired by Agilent Technologies in 2007. 

In 2006, Bevirt founded Joby Inc., a consumer products company that developed the notable Gorillapod flexible camera tripod. Bevirt also started Joby Energy with a focus on airborne wind turbines.

In 2009, he founded Joby Aviation, a company pioneering the development of all-electric aircraft that can take off and land vertically, while cruising like a traditional airplane. In 2020, his company received a signed G-1 Certification Basis from the FAA and airworthiness certification from the US Air Force. On August 11th 2021, the company began trading on the New York Stock Exchange, making Bevirt the world’s first eVTOL billionaire according to media reports.    

During the COVID19 pandemic, Bevirt worked with the genetics team at the University of California Santa Cruz to launch SummerBio, a company that provides affordable PCR tests with fast turnaround and high accuracy.   

In March 2022, Bevirt was invited to testify before the United States House Transportation and Infrastructure Committee during a hearing addressing concerns around aviation noise.

Achievements 
In 2018, Bevirt was announced as one of UC Davis’ ‘Most Distinguished Alumni’. He was also the 2018 recipient of the Paul. E. Haueter Award, presented by the Vertical Flight Society to recognize outstanding technical contributions to the field of vertical flight.

Personal life 
Bevirt lives in Santa Cruz with his wife, Jenny, and four children.

References 

Year of birth missing (living people)
Living people
University of California, Davis alumni
Stanford University alumni